Surabhiyum Suhasiniyum or Su Su is an Indian Malayalam-language sitcom directed by Rajesh Thalachira. It premiered on Flowers TV on 13 August 2022. The show stars Mallika Sukumaran and Anumol in lead roles. Sidharth Prabhu, Manju Pathrose, Riyas Narmakala, Sangeetha Sivan and Muhammad Rafi are seen in supporting roles as well. The show is launched as a weekend show but from September 26 2022 it began airing everyday at 7:00 PM.

Plot summary 
Set in Trivandrum, the story revolves around the life of a daughter-in-law and her mother-in-law engage in constant fights with each other due to their differences which leads to various complications for the family.

Cast

Main cast 
 Mallika Sukumaran as Suhasini Chandrahasan
 Anumol R. S. as Surabhi Pradheesh chandrahasan
 Sidharth Prabhu as Pradheesh Chandrahasan
 Muhammad Rafi as Manoj aka Ondhu Manu
 Jayaram V. Jayaram as Prashobh Chandrahasan
 Sangeetha Sivan as Lakshmi Prashobh chandrahasan
 Naiha sunil as Aami Prashobh chandrahasan
 Riyas Narmakala as Ambadikannan / Vakkeel Uncle
 Sabu Sudarshan Pillai as Muthu

Recurring cast 
 Manju Pathrose as Kochammini
 Kalabhavan Haneef as Surendran
 Aswathy Nair as Achu
 Benny John as Suvarna Kumar alias Mudiyan
 Shakeela as Urmila
 Abhilash Kottarakkara as Ambu
 Sibi Joseph as Achu’s fiancé
 Ramdas Sopanam as Palani Chettiyar
 Krishnendhu Unnikrishnan as Nayanthara
 Sreeramya Manu as Aasha
 Ambili Nair as Thankamani
 Reshmi Anil as Shamala
Sunil Sukhada

References 

Indian television sitcoms
Indian television soap operas
Serial drama television series
2022 Indian television series debuts
Malayalam-language television shows
Indian drama television series